Andreas Skår Winther (born 10 April 1991 in Ålesund, Norway) is a Norwegian musician (drums), the younger brother of jazz guitarist Christian Skår Winther (b. 1989), and is known from bands like Megalodon Collective and Left Exit, Mr K.

Career 

Winther is currently studying jazz and improvised music in the jazz program at Norwegian University of Science and Technology, and is active in several bands in the jazz and improvisation scene in Norway and Sweden. With the band Left Exit, Mr K, a duo project including Karl Hjalmar Nyberg (saxophones), he released the album Left Exit, Mr. K Featuring Michael Duch & Klaus Holm (2015). In 2015 he also played on the album Megalodon by Megalodon Collective. He has also given a series of solo drum performances live in Norway and performed in trio with Natalie Sandtorv and his guitarist brother Christian.

Honors 
2016: Winner of Jazzintro at the 2016 Moldejazz with Megalodon Collective

Discography 

With Left Exit, Mr. K
2015: Left Exit, Mr. K Featuring Michael Duch & Klaus Holm (Clean Feed)

With Megalodon Collective
2015: Megalodon (Gigafon Records)

References

External links 
MEGALODON COLLECTIVE LIVE on YouTube
Andreas Winther Solo @ Bråkesund at GuitarGaze.co.uk

21st-century Norwegian drummers
Norwegian jazz drummers
Male drummers
Norwegian percussionists
Norwegian University of Science and Technology alumni
Norwegian composers
Norwegian male composers
1991 births
Living people
Musicians from Ålesund
21st-century Norwegian male musicians
Male jazz musicians